TJ Fisher is a Southern author, documentarist and social critic who lives in New Orleans, Louisiana and Palm Beach, Florida.

Career 
Prior to being an author, Fisher had taken jobs as a journalist, gossip columnist, documentary filmmaker and ad agency/PR executive.

Post-Katrina 
After Hurricane Katrina, in late 2005 Fisher authored the narrative work Orléans Embrace, for which she received praise for her prose. Orléans Embrace is a three-part compendium: the first and third parts are by Fisher, and the middle part is the companion book, The Secret Gardens of the Vieux Carré by Roy F. Guste, Jr. with photography by Louis Sahuc. She was not paid for her work on the (post-Katrina) French Quarter fundraising book, a crusade for New Orleans.

Fisher received awards for Best New Voice Nonfiction and The Bill Fisher Award for Best First Book Nonfiction for Orléans Embrace with The Secret Gardens of the Vieux Carré at the PMA Publishers Marketing Association Benjamin Franklin Awards in 2007. At the Independent Publisher Book Awards it received a gold medal in the Home & Garden category. The title also won the Best Books 2007 Awards in the Home: General category.

Recent works 
Fisher's works center on New Orleans and the historic French Quarter (Vieux Carré). She was nominated for a Southern Independent Booksellers Alliance SIBA Book Award for her poetry in Hearsay from Heaven and Hades: New Orleans Secrets of Sinners and Saints. The title won the Best Books 2009 Awards Poetry: General category.

Beyond personal experience, her first post-Katrina work "imprinted a style reminiscent of Lafcadio Hearn". Gris Gris Rouge, a paper in Louisiana, wrote that FIsher's narratives celebrate and capture the elusive quality of New Orleans.

Real estate and controversy

In 2007 ex-NFL Raven football player Michael McCrary added Fisher to a lawsuit aimed at her husband and others for $60 million. The Circuit Court for Baltimore City civil litigation concerned a hurricane-derailed New Orleans real estate venture at the New Orleans landmark (Crescent City Towers) Plaza Tower site. McCrary's case targeted a tangle of Louisiana limited liability companies. The soured real estate and development investment deal netted McCrary and a web of partnerships millions of dollars in post-Katrina profits within a few months. McCrary reaped $2,384,639 in profits and the return of his $3,550,000 capital investment.

In June 2008, a Baltimore courtroom rendered a $33.3-million-dollar default judgment against Fisher and others, in favor of McCrary. Precedent to the award, all defendants and their attorneys were precluded from speaking or participating in the damages hearing inquisition. Legal analysts cited U.S. Constitution and Due Process violations.

Fisher was unable to post a $33.3-million-dollar supersedeas bond to stay execution of McCrary's default judgment against her during the pendency of the appeal. Nearly a year after the trial court default, the Maryland Court of Special Appeals granted a stay against the judgment without a bond being posted.

In June 2009 the Maryland intermediate appellate court tossed the $33.3-million-dollar default judgment against Fisher and others.

In earlier Pre-Katrina litigation on eminent domain site expropriation by the New Orleans Morial Convention Center, Fisher retained Johnnie Cochran to represent herself and a partner. On a separate but nearby parcel of property, Fisher turned over her winning-bid auction contract on a multimillion-dollar Mississippi River riverfront ex-casino property to Tulane University, at no profit, for future development of the Riversphere project. The former River Gate Casino tract was previously associated with hotelier/developer/dreamer Christopher Hemmeter and Louisiana ex-governor Edwin Edwards.

In the late 90s, Fisher was one of the original owner/developers of the Ritz-Carlton Coconut Grove, Miami, Florida; she was also associated with the South Beach and Baltimore Ritz projects.

On several joint-venture projects Fisher aligned with Philip Pilevsky of Philips International, the on-off financier/partner of hotelier Ian Schrager. The Schrager/Philip pairing began with Studio 54. Later, in conjunction with designer Philip Stark, they founded original boutique hotels, including  New York City's Paramount Hotel and Royalton Hotel, Miami's Delano Hotel and Shore Club, and LA's Mondrian Hotel.

Personal life 
She helped found the Rufus Fisher Dog Angel program at Kansas State University College of Veterinary Medicine, a program established in memory of her late yellow Labrador retriever.

Fisher resides with one of the three original 1940s Howdy Doody marionettes, Photo Doody.

References

External links 
 Official web site

Year of birth missing (living people)
Living people
Writers from New Orleans
People from Palm Beach, Florida
American women writers
21st-century American women